Mario Gabriele Andretti (born February 28, 1940) is an Italian-born American former racing driver. One of the most successful drivers in the history of motorsports, Andretti is one of only three drivers to have won races in Formula One, IndyCar, the World Sportscar Championship, and NASCAR (the others being Dan Gurney and Juan Pablo Montoya). He has also won races in midget car racing and sprint car racing.

During his career, Andretti won the 1978 Formula One World Championship, four IndyCar titles (three under USAC sanctioning, and one in CART), and IROC VI. To date, he remains the only driver ever to win the Indianapolis 500 (1969), Daytona 500 (1967) and the Formula One World Championship, and, along with Juan Pablo Montoya, the only driver to have won a race in the NASCAR Cup Series, Formula One, and an Indianapolis 500. As of 2021, Andretti's victory at the 1978 Dutch Grand Prix is the last Formula One win by an American driver. Andretti had 109 career wins on major circuits.

Andretti had a long career in motorsports. He was the only person to be named United States Driver of the Year in three decades (1967, 1978, and 1984). He was also one of only three drivers to have won major races on road courses, paved ovals, and dirt tracks in one season, a feat that he accomplished four times. With his final IndyCar win in April 1993, Andretti became the first driver to have won IndyCar races in four different decades and the first to win automobile races of any kind in five.

In American popular culture, Andretti's name has become synonymous with speed, similar to Barney Oldfield in the early twentieth century and Stirling Moss in the United Kingdom.

Early life
Mario Andretti and his twin brother Aldo were born to Alvise Andretti, a farm administrator, and his wife, Rina, in Montona, Kingdom of Italy, now Motovun, Croatia. Istria was then part of the Kingdom of Italy, but it became part of Yugoslavia at the end of World War II, as confirmed by the Treaty of Paris (1947) and Treaty of Osimo (1975). The Andretti family, like many other Istrian Italians, left in 1948, during the Istrian–Dalmatian exodus, ending up in a refugee camp in Lucca, Italy.

Andretti told author Paul Stenning: "My father left everything behind, we left our home and took what we could carry and went further into Italy. They had to swallow all of these families that were dispersed and they formed all different camps over Italy and we were shipped to a place in Tuscany. Life was a bit weird at the time but the one thing that my father always did, he always provided for us. As kids we were never cold, we were never hungry, we went to school, he always provided quite well."

Racing career

Childhood involvement in motorsports
The twins' mother Rina said that when they were two years old, they would take pot lids out of the cupboards and run around the kitchen, going "Vroom, vroom," like they were driving cars before the twins had even yet seen a car. In 1945, at age five, he and Aldo were racing their hand-crafted wooden cars through the steep streets of their hometown. Later, the brothers were hired by a garage to park cars, Andretti described the experience in his book What's It Like Out There: "The first time I fired up a car, felt the engine shudder and the wheel come to life in my hands, I was hooked. It was a feeling I can't describe. I still get it every time I get into a race car." Andretti's first racing experience was in a new youth racing league called Formula Junior  in Ancona, Italy when he was thirteen years old. Years later, in an interview during an RRDC Evening with Mario Andretti, Andretti implied that he and his brother made up the story of racing in the Formula Junior league when they moved to Pennsylvania to improve their chances of competing in dirt track racing because they looked the part after having purchased racing suits in Italy.

Marco De Cesari and Danilo Piccinini, the owners of the garage, noticed the Andretti brothers passion for racing and brought them to the Abetone pass to watch a stretch of the Mille Miglia race in 1954 which caused him to become captivated by Italian two-time Formula One world champion Alberto Ascari, who won the race. Later in the same year, Piccinini brought the brothers to the Monza for the Italian Grand Prix, where Andretti saw Ascari and Juan Manuel Fangio race against each other. "I remember being just mesmerized, overwhelmed by the sound, by the speed" Andretti recalled years later. "We didn’t even have a grandstand seat, we were up on that bank before the Parabolica on the left. You know, we had a good view of things ".

Stock car racing

Move to the US and start in racing

Andretti's father had maintained contact with his brother-in-law who had lived in the U.S. for many years. It took the family three years to obtain a U.S. visa. Alvise Andretti initially told the family they would move to the U.S. for five years and then return to Italy. In 1955, the Andretti family emigrated to the U.S., settling in Nazareth in the Lehigh Valley region of eastern Pennsylvania with just $125 to their name.

Mario has explained, "When I looked at my life in many ways out of so many negatives here comes a positive and this was certainly one of them, here was an opportunity created for us, the kids, and my dad always cited that. He would say in a sense I am looking at your future, where I think would be the best solution for you kids to have opportunities and he was correct, he was right because if we had remained in Italy I don’t know whether I could have pursued what my first passion was and the only passion I really had career wise."

While getting acquainted with Pennsylvania, Mario and Aldo were surprised to find a half-mile dirt racing track Nazareth Speedway in Nazareth. The twins worked on a 1948 Hudson and raced it in the Limited Sportsman Class, funded by money that they earned in their uncle's garage in 1959. They took turns racing the old Hudson on oval dirt tracks near Nazareth. After finishing high school, Mario planned to become a welder, but he falsified a driver license so he could pass for 21 and enter an amateur race. Mario and Aldo did not tell their parents that they were racing. The twins each had two wins after their first four races. Aldo was seriously hurt near the end of the season, and their parents were unhappy to find out that the twins were racing. Mario had 21 modified stock car wins in 46 races in 1960 and 1961.

USAC stock car
Andretti became a naturalized U.S. citizen in 1964. He competed in United States Automobile Club (USAC) stock car events in 1965, and finished twelfth in the season points. He won a USAC Stock Car race in 1967, and finished seventh in the season points. He won three 1974 USAC stock car races on road courses, and won four road course races in 1975.

NASCAR

Andretti competed in fourteen NASCAR Grand National/Winston Cup (now NASCAR Cup Series) events in his career. He competed in Holman Moody cars for his final ten events. Holman Moody was one of NASCAR's most successful teams at that time, as the team won NASCAR championships in 1968 and 1969 with driver David Pearson. Andretti won the 1967 Daytona 500 for Holman Moody.

International Race of Champions
Andretti was invited to race in six International Race of Champions (IROC) series in his career. His best years were his first three years. He finished second in the final points standings in IROC III (1975–1976) and IROC V (1977–1978). He won the IROC VI (1978–1979) points championship with finishes of third, first, and second. He won three races in twenty events.

Open-wheel racing

Early open-wheel racing
Andretti's goal was to race in single-seater open-wheel cars. Andretti said "Aldo and I were winning in the modifieds. But my objective was to get into open-wheelers."

Andretti raced midget cars from 1961 to 1963. He started racing 3/4 (sized) midget cars in the American Three Quarter Midget Racing Association in the winter to be seen by full-sized midget car owners. He raced in over one hundred events in 1963. Andretti won three feature races at two different tracks on Labor Day in 1963. He won an afternoon feature at Flemington, New Jersey, and swept twin features at Hatfield, Pennsylvania.

The next rung on the racing ladder on the East Coast of the United States was to race in sprint cars in the United Racing Club (URC). Andretti was able to get a ride for individual races in the URC sprint car racing series, but was unable to secure a full-time ride. He once drove from Canada to Mechanicsburg, Pennsylvania hoping to find a ride in an event, but he went empty-handed. He bypassed the series when he was offered a full-time ride in a United States Automobile Club sprint car for 1964.

USAC sprint cars
Andretti won the 1964 Joe James-Pat O'Connor Memorial USAC sprint car race at Salem Speedway in Salem, Indiana. Andretti continued to race in USAC sprint cars after moving into champ cars. In 1965 he won once at Ascot Park, and finished tenth in the season points. In 1966 he won five times (Cumberland, Maryland, Oswego, New York, Rossburg, Ohio, Phoenix, Arizona, and his second win at the Joe James-Pat O'Connor Memorial at Salem Speedway), but finished behind Roger McCluskey in the season championship. In 1967 he won two of the three events that he entered.

IndyCar career (1964–1974)

From 1956 to 1979, the top open-wheel racing series in North America was the USAC National Championship. It was often referred to as Champ Car racing, or Indycar racing, referring to the famous Indianapolis 500 race which was the centerpiece of the championship. The races were run on a mixture of paved and dirt ovals, and in later years also included some road courses.

Andretti made his Champ Car debut on April 19, 1964, at the New Jersey State fairgrounds in Trenton, New Jersey. He started sixteenth and finished eleventh. Andretti was introduced by his USAC sprint car owner, Rufus Gray, to veteran mechanic Clint Brawner. Brawner was not impressed since sprint car drivers Stan Bowman and Donnie Davis had recently died, and Brawner's current driver, Chuck Hulse, had been critically injured. Chris Economaki recommended Andretti to Brawner, so Brawner watched Andretti race at Terre Haute, Indiana. Brawner was convinced that he had found the new driver for his team. The two stayed together for six years. Andretti finished eleventh in the USAC National Championship that season. Andretti won his first championship car race at the Hoosier Grand Prix on a road course at Indianapolis Raceway Park in 1965. His third-place finish at the 1965 Indianapolis 500 in the Brawner Hawk (a mechanical copy of the current Brabham Formula 1 design) earned him the race's Rookie of the Year award, and contributed towards Andretti winning the series championship. He was the youngest national champion in series history at age 25. He repeated as series champion in 1966, winning eight of fifteen events. He also won the pole at the 1966 Indianapolis 500. Andretti finished second in the IndyCars in 1967 and 1968. He also won a single non-championship drag race in 1967 in a Ford Mustang. In both 1967 and 1968, Andretti lost the season USAC championship to A. J. Foyt and Bobby Unser, respectively, in the waning laps of the last race of the season at Riverside, California—each by the smallest points margin in history.

Andretti won nine races in 1969, the 1969 Indianapolis 500, and the season championship. He also won the Pikes Peak International Hill Climb, which was part of the USAC National Championship. He was named ABC's Wide World of Sports Athlete of the Year. Between 1966 and 1969 he won 29 of 85 USAC championship races.

In 1973, USAC split its National Championship into dirt and pavement championships. Andretti had one win on the pavement and finished fifth in the season points, and finished second in the dirt championship. He competed in USAC's dirt track division in 1974, and won the dirt track championship while competing in both series. Andretti also competed in the North American Formula 5000 series in 1973 and 1974, and finished second in the championship in both seasons.

Formula One career

Part-time status (1968–1972, 1974)

Formula One is the highest form of open-wheel racing sanctioned by the Fédération Internationale de l'Automobile (FIA), motorsport's international governing body. Although originating in Europe, by the 1960s it included races worldwide. At Andretti's first Indianapolis 500, in 1965, he met Colin Chapman, owner of the Lotus Formula One team, who was running eventual race winner Jim Clark's car. Andretti told Chapman of his ambition to compete in Formula One and was told "When you're ready, call me." By 1968 Andretti felt he was ready. Chapman gave him a car, and the young American took the pole position on his debut at the 1968 United States Grand Prix at Watkins Glen in his Lotus 49.

Andretti drove sporadically in Formula One over the next four years for Lotus, March, and Ferrari, while continuing to focus on his racing career in America. At the 1971 South African Grand Prix, on his debut for Ferrari, he won his first Grand Prix. "That was a big moment, one of those I’ll always cherish,” recalled Andretti. "Kyalami was a fun circuit to drive with lots of elevation changes and Ferrari gave me equal equipment to my teammates. It was a good weekend." Three weeks later, at the non-championship Questor Grand Prix in the U.S., he brought the Italian team a second victory. The day before the Questor GP, he had finished 9th in the Indy car race at Phoenix International Raceway. At the end of the season, Ferrari called Andretti and made him a pitch to be his No. 1 driver but |Andretti declined. "F1 didn’t pay much back then and my contracts and commitments were so lucrative over here I couldn’t give that up for the security of my family. The timing wasn’t right yet, so I had to turn him down; but I always figured I’d get another opportunity."

Full-time status (1975–1981)
It wasn't until 1975 that Andretti drove a full Formula One season, for the American Parnelli team. The team was new to Formula One, although it had been successful in both Formula 5000 and IndyCar racing in America with Andretti driving. The team had run Andretti in the two North American end-of-season races in 1974 with promising results. Andretti qualified fourth and led the 1975 Spanish Grand Prix for nine laps before his suspension failed. He scored five championship points in the season. Andretti continued to compete in IndyCar, missing two Formula One races in the middle of the season to do so.
When the Parnelli team pulled out of Formula One after two races of the 1976 season, Andretti returned to Chapman's Lotus team, for whom he had already driven at the season-opening Brazilian Grand Prix. Lotus was then at a low point, having failed to produce a competitive car to replace 1970's Lotus 72. Andretti's ability at developing a racing car contributed to Lotus' return to the front of the Formula One grid, culminating in lapping the field in his victory at the season ending race at the Mount Fuji circuit in Japan. Since mid-1975 Lotus had been developing the use of ground effect, shaping the underside of the car to generate downforce with little penalizing drag. For his part, Andretti worked at setting up his cars for the races, exploiting subtle differences in tire size ('stagger') and suspension set up ('cross weighting') on each side of the car to optimize it for each track, an approach imported from his extensive oval racing experience in the United States. In 1977, at Long Beach, he became the only American to win the United States Grand Prix West, and the last American as of 2022 to win any US Grand Prix. The Lotus 78 "wing car" proved to be the most competitive car of 1977, but despite winning four races, more than any other driver, reliability problems and collisions with other drivers meant Andretti finished only third in the championship.

At the end of 1977, Andretti was approached by Ferrari as a potential replacement for Niki Lauda. "I had a handshake agreement with Colin and he’d already agreed to pay me what Ronnie Peterson was making, which was the highest salary in F1. So I asked Mr. Ferrari what was he willing to pay me.He said, 'You know, Mario, I can’t put a price on your talent so you tell me.' That SOB threw it right back in my lap! Well, [Andretti's wife] Dee Ann was sitting next to me and I asked her what should I do and she said ‘double it.' And Mr. Ferrari agreed. The next day I got a telex from him saying 'Let’s just leave things alone' because he’d just had a visit from Colin (who'd) followed me to Maranello and raised hell with Mr. Ferrari. Can you imagine? So I told Colin he'd always been good to me but you don't want an unhappy driver. Then I told him I wanted $10,000 a point — you got nine points for a win back then — and he had to agree.'

In 1978, the Lotus 79 designed by Chapman exploited ground effect even further. Andretti dominated the season and took the title with six wins. He clinched the championship at the Italian Grand Prix. There was no championship celebration though because his teammate Ronnie Peterson crashed heavily at the start of the race; he was hospitalised and died that night from complications resulting from his injuries.

Andretti found little success after 1978 in Formula One – he failed to win another grand prix. He had a difficult year in 1979, as the new Lotus 80 was not competitive, and the team had to rely on the Lotus 79 which had been overtaken by the second generation of ground effect cars. In 1980, he was paired with the young Italian Elio de Angelis, and briefly with test driver Nigel Mansell, but the team was again unsuccessful.

For the 1981 season, Andretti decided to move to the Alfa Romeo team ran by Carlo Chiti. Although the car was reasonably competitive (Andretti finished fourth on his debut with the team in Long Beach), a general lack of reliability resulted in yet another unsuccessful campaign. Like other drivers of the period, Andretti did not like the ground effect cars of the time: "the cars were getting absurd, really crude, with no suspension movement whatever. It was toggle switch driving with no need for any kind of delicacy...it made leaving Formula One a lot easier than it would have been."

Brief returns with Williams and Ferrari (1982)
The next year, Andretti raced once for the Williams team, after their driver Carlos Reutemann suddenly quit, before replacing the seriously injured Didier Pironi at Ferrari for the last two races of the year. Suspension failure dropped him out of the last race of the season, but at the Italian Grand Prix at Monza he took the pole position and finished third in the race.

There was almost a return to F1 for Andretti at the 1984 Detroit Grand Prix when the Renault team put him on standby to replace regular driver Patrick Tambay if the Frenchman had been unable to race, as was the case at the previous race in Canada. However, in the event, Tambay was able to take part in the race.

Andretti was also considered as a replacement, again for Tambay who had been injured in Canada, at the 1986 Detroit Grand Prix, this time for the Carl Haas-owned Haas Lola team. Andretti declined, but recommended his son Michael Andretti. When Michael was unable to obtain the FIA Superlicense required to allow him to race in Formula One, the drive went to Eddie Cheever.

Return to IndyCar racing (1982–1994)

Andretti had continued to race, and occasionally win, in the USAC National Championship during his time in the Formula One world championship. In 1979 a new organization, Championship Auto Racing Teams (CART), had set up the IndyCar World Series as a rival to the USAC National Championships that Andretti had won three times in the 1960s. The new series had rapidly become the top open-wheel racing series in North America.

Andretti joined CART full-time in 1982, driving for Patrick Racing. He started from row two in the Indianapolis 500 that year but was involved in a wreck on the approach to the start when rookie Kevin Cogan suddenly spun out. Three minutes after the wreck Andretti was heard saying "This is what happens when you have children doing a man's job up front," and he and Cogan were later involved in a shoving match.

In 1983, he joined the new Newman/Haas Racing team, set up by Carl Haas and actor Paul Newman using cars built by British company Lola. Andretti took the team's first win at Elkhart Lake in 1983. He won the pole for nine of sixteen events in 1984, and claimed his fourth Champ Car title at the age of 44. He edged out Tom Sneva by 13 points. It was the first series title for the second year team.

Mario's son Michael joined Newman/Haas in 1989. Together, they made history as the first father/son team to compete in both IMSA GT and Champ Car racing, as for the former, it was their fourth time in an endurance race together as co-drivers. Mario finished seventh in points for the 1991 season, the year that Michael won the championship. Mario's last victory in IndyCar racing came in 1993 at Phoenix International Raceway, the year that Michael left Newman/Haas to race in Formula One. The win made Mario the oldest recorded winner in an IndyCar event (53 years, 34 days old). The speed was a new closed course world record. Andretti's final season, in 1994, was dubbed "The Arrivederci Tour". He raced in the last of his 407 Indy car races that September.

Indianapolis 500

Andretti won once at the Indianapolis 500 in 29 attempts. Andretti has had so many incidents and near victories at the track that critics have dubbed the family's performance after Mario's 1969 Indianapolis 500 victory the "Andretti Curse".

Andretti finished all  just five times, including his 1969 Indianapolis 500 victory. Andretti was the first driver to exceed  while practicing for the 1977 Indianapolis 500. In 1969, after 4 years of bad luck and 4 non-finishes, Andretti dominated the Indianapolis 500 en route to his only victory in the race. The race is notable as it is the only Indy 500 in history where the winning driver ran the whole race on only 1 set of tires.

Between his 1969 victory in the race and 1981, Andretti dropped out of the races due to part failures or crashes. His luck seemed to turn around in 1981. Andretti finished second in the 1981 Indianapolis 500 by eight seconds behind Bobby Unser. The following day Unser was penalized one lap for passing cars under a caution flag, and Andretti was declared the winner. Unser and his car owner Roger Penske appealed the race stewards' decision. USAC overturned the one lap penalty four months later, and penalized Unser with a $40,000 fine.

At the start of the 1982 Indianapolis 500, second-year driver Kevin Cogan, teammate to polesitter Rick Mears, suddenly spun right when accelerating for the green flag. Cogan bounced off A. J. Foyt, slamming Foyt's steering rod. That contact turned Cogan's car left at a 90 degree angle to the field where he was promptly t-boned by Mario. Andretti was livid and engaged in a shoving match with Cogan before walking off. In an interview, 3 minutes after the wreck, an irked Andretti was heard saying "This is what happens when you have children doing a man's job up front." Andretti's Patrick Racing teammate that year was the eventual race winner, Gordon Johncock, who started next to Andretti in the middle of row two. In later years, Johncock pointed out that Andretti had jumped the start, and could have avoided the spinning car of Cogan had he been lined up properly in the second row next to Gordy.

In the 1985 Indianapolis 500, he was passed for the lead by Danny Sullivan in Turn One on lap 20. Immediately after completing the pass, Sullivan spun in front of Andretti. A caution flag for the spin minimized the time Sullivan would lose to Andretti by pitting to replace his tires. Sullivan took the lead for good 20 laps later when he passed Andretti without incident.  Andretti dominated the 1987 Indianapolis 500, leading 170 of the first 177 laps of the race. His lead was so large, that he was advised to slow his pace to preserve his equipment. In a cruel twist of fate, when Andretti started running slower, his reduced engine rpm's created a harmonic imbalance in his turbocharged Ilmor/Chevrolet V8 that led to a broken valve spring with 20 laps to go.

The 1992 Indianapolis 500 was run in extremely cold weather which resulted in a large number of wrecks by cars on cold tires. Andretti accelerated off of turn three for the restart at the end of the 83rd lap.  Under acceleration, Mario's car got loose in the middle of turn four and rotated 270 degrees to smash nose first into the wall. Andretti was taken to the hospital with six of his toes broken and would shortly be joined by his son Jeff Andretti who smashed both legs after a wheel came loose on his race car on the 109th lap of the race. Mario would only miss one race due to his injuries, and returned to run 6th in a race just four weeks after his crash.

The 1993 Indianapolis 500 was Andretti's last notable run, and he had just come off a victory at Phoenix. On pole day, Andretti was the first car to complete a qualifying run, and sat on the provisional pole position. Andretti's speed held up all afternoon, but with less than an hour to go, Arie Luyendyk topped his speed, and took the pole. On race day, Andretti was a factor most of the afternoon, leading the most laps (72). While leading on lap 134, Andretti was penalized for entering the pits while they were closed. A stop-and-go penalty dropped him only down to second place. In the final 50 laps, he began developing handling problems because of his tires, and slid down the standings to finish 5th. Andretti's last race at Indy was the 1994 Indianapolis 500.

On April 23, 2003, in the lead up to the 2003 Indy 500, Andretti took to the track for the first time in ten years in a major open-wheel car at the age of 63. He participated in a test session for son Michael's AGR IndyCar team. One of the team's regular drivers, Tony Kanaan, suffered a radial fracture of his arm a week earlier in an April 15 crash at Twin Ring Motegi. If Kanaan was not cleared to drive in enough time, tentative plans were being prepared for Andretti to qualify the car for him. He would turn the car over to Kanaan on race day, though no plans had been made for Andretti to actually drive in the race. During the test, Andretti ran at competitive speeds, but running over debris saw his car becoming airborne and the attempt ended with a spectacular crash. Andretti was able to walk away from the wreck with just a minor cut on his chin. This was Andretti's last significant on-track activity at Indianapolis.

Sports cars
His first race start with a Ferrari was in 1965 with a Ferrari 275 P during the Bridgehampton 500 km at Bridgehampton Race Circuit he did not finish the race.

Andretti won three 12 Hours of Sebring endurance races (1967, 1970, 1972), and the 24 Hours of Daytona in 1972. In early sportscar races he competed for the Holman Moody team, but later often drove for Ferrari. He signed with Ferrari in 1971, and won several races with co-driver Jacky Ickx. In 1972 he shared wins in the three North American rounds of the championship and at Brands Hatch in the UK, contributing to Ferrari's dominant victory in that year's World Championship for Makes. He also competed in the popular North American Can-Am series in the late 1960s and early 1970s.

Le Mans
Andretti competed at the 24 Hours of Le Mans in four decades. In 1966 he shared a Holman Moody Ford Mk II with Lucien Bianchi. They retired after their car dropped a valve at 10:30 pm. In 1967, during a 3:30 am pit stop, a mechanic inadvertently installed a front brake pad backward on his Ford MkIV. As Andretti passed under the Dunlop Bridge before the Esses, he touched his brake pedal for the first time since leaving the pits. The wreckage slid to a stop with Andretti badly shaken, the car sideways to oncoming traffic and the track nearly blocked. His teammates, Jo Schlesser and Roger McCluskey, crashed trying to avoid Andretti's car. McCluskey pulled Andretti to safety, and Andretti was taken to hospital for x-rays.

Andretti did not return to Le Mans until his full-time Formula One career was over. In 1982, he partnered with son Michael in a Mirage M12 Ford. They qualified in ninth place, but the pair found their car being removed from the starting grid 80 minutes before the start of the race, as an official discovered an oil cooler that was mounted behind the gearbox, which was against the rules. The car had passed initial inspection four days before the race. Despite protests and complaints, Andretti's entry was removed altogether, replaced by a Porsche 924 Carrera GTR. Their return in the following year was more successful as they finished third. They finished sixth in a factory Porsche 962. Following Mario's retirement from full-time racing, he decided on a return to the circuit to add a Le Mans victory to his achievements. He said in a 2006 interview that he feels that the Courage Compétition team "lost [the 1995] race five times over" through poor organization. Andretti's final appearance at Le Mans was at the 2000 race, six years after his retirement from full-time racing, when he drove the Panoz LMP-1 Roadster-S at the age of 60, finishing 15th.

Awards and honors

In 1986, he was inducted into the Indianapolis Motor Speedway Hall of Fame. In 2000, the Associated Press and RACER magazine named him Driver of the Century. He was the Driver of the Year (in the United States) for three years (1967, 1978, and 1984), and is the only driver to be Driver of the Year in three decades. Andretti was named the U.S. Driver of the Quarter Century in 1992. He was inducted into the International Motorsports Hall of Fame in 2001, the United States National Sprint Car Hall of Fame in 1996, the Motorsports Hall of Fame of America in 1990, the Hoosier Auto Racing Hall of Fame in 1970, the Automotive Hall of Fame in 2005, and the Diecast Hall of Fame in 2012.

On October 23, 2006, Andretti was awarded the highest civilian honor given by the Italian government, the Commendatore dell'Ordine al Merito della Repubblica Italiana (known as the Commendatore), in honor of his racing career, public service, and enduring commitment to his Italian heritage. In 2007, Andretti was honored with the "Lombardi Award of Excellence" from the Vince Lombardi Cancer Foundation for making "a "Hall of Fame" contribution to a sport, profession, or business in a manner that exemplifies appreciation of God, country, society, family and self."

In 2007, Andretti was named the "Mayor" (Sindaco) of the "Free Commune of Motovun in Exile" (Libero Comune di Montona in esilio), an association of Italian exiles from Motovun.

In 2008, Andretti was awarded with the Simeone Foundation Spirit of Competition Award.

In 2016, Andretti was made an honorary citizen of Lucca.

In 2019, the city of Indianapolis renamed a street "Mario Andretti Drive", as part of the celebrations of the 50th anniversary of his first Indianapolis 500 win.

Mario Andretti Grand Prix of Road America
Mario was instrumental in keeping championship car racing at Road America. CART severed its ties with the track as a legal resolution of payment issues from the 2002 and 2003 series events at the track. Andretti was the middle man between CART President Chris Pook and Road America President George Bruggenthies. After six weeks both sides came to terms and signed a two-year contract. The event was renamed the "Mario Andretti Grand Prix of Road America".

Elder of Andretti racing family

Both of Mario Andretti's sons, Michael and Jeff, were auto racers. Michael followed in his father's footsteps by winning the IndyCar title, with Mario's nephew John Andretti joining the series in 1988. This meant that the Andrettis became the first family to have four relatives compete in the same series. With Mario sharing driving duties with sons Michael and Jeff at the 1991 Rolex 24 at Daytona, driving a Porsche 962, the Andretti clan finished 5th.

Mario's grandson Marco completed his first full season in the Indy Racing League (IRL) in 2006, driving for his father Michael's Andretti Green Racing team. Marco finished second in the 2006 Indianapolis 500 and so became the first third-generation recipient of the race's Rookie of the Year Award.

Later life

Andretti lives near his grandson Marco in Bushkill Township, Pennsylvania. His late wife Dee Ann (née Hoch) was a native of Nazareth, Pennsylvania, who taught Andretti English in 1961.  They were married on November 25, 1961. She died on July 2, 2018, following a heart attack.

Andretti has kept active after his retirement from full-time racing. He makes numerous speaking engagements to audiences and is a spokesman for longtime sponsors Texaco/Havoline, Firestone and Magnaflow performance exhaust. He was occasionally a spokesman for the defunct Champ Car World Series, though he frequently attended IRL races to watch Marco compete. Andretti is vice chairman of a winery named Andretti Winery in Napa Valley, California. He owns a chain of gasoline stations, a Toyota dealership in Moon Township, Pennsylvania (just outside Pittsburgh), car washes, car-care products, go-kart tracks, a clothing line, video games and replica cars. He also test drives cars for Road & Track and Car and Driver magazines.

In July 2006, Andretti took part in the Bullrun race across America. The first pitstop was at the Pocono Raceway in Andretti's home state of Pennsylvania with Gate No. 5 aptly named Andretti Road.

Since 2012, Andretti has been the official ambassador for the Circuit of the Americas (COTA) and the United States Grand Prix promoting awareness of Formula 1 in the United States and all forms of motorsports at COTA.

He received the America Award of the Italy-USA Foundation in 2015.

Film and television appearances
Andretti played himself on three episodes of the United States television show Home Improvement. Along with his son Michael, he appeared in the 1996 IMAX film Super Speedway, which details the process of rebuilding one of his past cars. He is a major character and sometime narrator of the 1972 film The Speed Merchants. In the 2006 Pixar Animation Studios film Cars, Andretti makes a cameo appearance as himself, but because all of the characters in the film are sentient cars, his appearance is that of the Ford Fairlane in which he won the 1967 Daytona 500. He later had another voice role in the 2013 DreamWorks Animation film Turbo, as the traffic director at Indianapolis Motor Speedway.

Andretti appeared in the Sylvester Stallone film Driven in a cameo. He served as the grand marshal of the 2004 Baja 1000 off-road race, as seen in the documentary film Dust to Glory. Andretti was featured in the 2007 documentary A State of Vine, where he commented on his winemaking activities. In November 2015, he guest starred on an episode of Jay Leno's Garage, driving Leno in multiple fast cars and talking about his racing career.

Andretti wrote a  column for the Indianapolis Star, where he wrote about other drivers, equipment and cars.

Racing record

Racing career summary

American open-wheel racing
(key) (Races in bold indicate pole position)

USAC Championship Car

Andretti Racing Enterprises IndyCar wins
These are the wins of Andretti Racing Enterprises, the team headed by legendary mechanic Clint Brawner.  Andretti Racing Enterprises (the former Dean Van Lines team) was formed after Al Dean's death in 1967 and was financed during the 1968 season by Firestone.

PPG Indy Car World Series

Indianapolis 500

NASCAR
(key) (Bold – Pole position awarded by qualifying time. Italics – Pole position earned by points standings or practice time. * – Most laps led.)

Grand National Series

Daytona 500

24 Hours of Le Mans results

Complete Formula One World Championship results
(key) (Races in bold indicate pole position; races in italics indicate fastest lap)

Other race results
 12 hours of Sebring, 1st: 1967,1970,1972
 1000 km of Brands Hatch, 1st: 1972
 1000 km of Monza, 1st: 1974
 Pikes Peak International Hill Climb, 1st: 1969
 6 Hours of Daytona, 1st: 1972
 6 Hours of Watkins Glen, 1st: 1972

Autobiographies

 What's It Like Out There, Mario Andretti and Bob Collins. Henry Regnery Company, 1970. .
 Mario Andretti: World Champion, Mario Andretti and Nigel Roebuck. Hamlyn, 1979. .
 Andretti, Mario Andretti. HarperCollins, 1994. .

See also
 List of celebrities who own wineries and vineyards

References

Further reading 

 Mario Andretti: A Driving Passion, Gordon Kirby. D. Bull Pub., 2001, .
 Mario Andretti Photo Album, Peter Nygaard. Iconografix, 1999, .
 Mario Andretti (Race Car Legends), G. S. Prentzas. Chelsea House Publishers, 1996, .
 Sports Hero, Mario Andretti, Marshall Burchard. Putnam, 1977. .
 Mario Andretti: The Man Who Can Win Any Kind of Race, Lyle K. Engel. Arco Publishing, 1970. .
 Mario Andretti: World Driving Champion, Lyle K. Engel. Arco Publishing, 1979. .
 Mario Andretti, Mike O'Leary. MotorBooks, 2002. .
 Andretti, Bill Libby. Grosset & Dunlap, 1970, .

External links

 
 
 
 Andretti Family Official Web Site
 Andretti Winery
 
 Mario Andretti at the Automotive Hall of Fame

1940 births
12 Hours of Sebring drivers
24 Hours of Daytona drivers
24 Hours of Le Mans drivers
Alfa Romeo Formula One drivers
American Formula One drivers
Mario Gabriele
Champ Car drivers
Champ Car champions
Child refugees
Ferrari Formula One drivers
Formula One World Drivers' Champions
Formula One race winners
Identical twins
Indianapolis 500 drivers
Indianapolis 500 polesitters
Indianapolis 500 Rookies of the Year
Indianapolis 500 winners
International Motorsports Hall of Fame inductees
International Race of Champions drivers
Istrian Italian people
Italian emigrants to the United States
Italian racing drivers
Italians of Croatia
Living people
March Formula One drivers
NASCAR drivers
National Sprint Car Hall of Fame inductees
Parnelli Formula One drivers
People from Motovun
People from Nazareth, Pennsylvania
People with acquired American citizenship
Racing drivers from Pennsylvania
Sportspeople from Northampton County, Pennsylvania
Team Lotus Formula One drivers
Italian twins
American twins
Twin sportspeople
Williams Formula One drivers
World Sportscar Championship drivers
Team Penske drivers
Newman/Haas Racing drivers
USAC Silver Crown Series drivers
USAC Stock Car drivers
Porsche Motorsports drivers
BMW M drivers
Jaguar Racing drivers